Monique M. Smith (born ) is a former politician in Ontario, Canada. She was a Liberal member of the Legislative Assembly of Ontario from 2003 to 2011 who represented the riding of Nipissing. She was a cabinet minister in the government of Dalton McGuinty.

Background
Smith was born and raised in North Bay, Ontario, the largest city in the Nipissing riding.  She has a Bachelor of Arts degree from the University of Toronto, and a law degree from Queen's University. After graduating, she worked at the Toronto law firm of McCarthy Tétrault until 1997, when she resigned to work as chief of staff for provincial Liberal leader Dalton McGuinty.  She served as director of operations for the Liberals in the 1999 provincial election, which the party lost.

After this election, Smith became executive director of the Association of Canadian Publishers, and represented the organization across the country.  She returned to North Bay in 2002, and worked for the firm of Larmer and Larmer.

Her father, Dick Smith, represented Nipissing in the legislature from 1965 to 1977. Her mother Marthe Smith was the Liberal candidate for the riding in 1987.

Politics
Smith ran for political office in the 2003 provincial election, in the Nipissing riding (until recently held by former Progressive Conservative Premier Mike Harris).  Despite her roots in the North Bay community, she was often described as a "Toronto lawyer" and a "parachute candidate" by the Tory campaign.  These criticisms were not an obstacle to her being elected, and she defeated Harris' immediate successor, Al McDonald, by just over 3,000 votes.

The Liberals won the election, and Smith was subsequently named parliamentary assistant to George Smitherman, the Minister of Health and Long-Term Care. In December 2003, Smitherman commissioned her to undertake a comprehensive review of the province's long-term care system. The review was published in May 2004 calling for more funding and inspections.

On October 30, 2007 following the provincial election, Premier Dalton McGuinty appointed Smith into cabinet as the province's Minister of Revenue. In a cabinet shuffle on September 18, 2008, Smith was appointed as the province's Minister of Tourism. On February 4, 2009 Smith was appointed Government House Leader. She continued as Minister of Tourism until she was appointed Minister of Intergovernmental Affairs in January 2010.

On November 19, 2010, Smith announced that she would not run in the 2011 election.

In August 2013, Premier Kathleen Wynne appointed Smith to represent the Government of Ontario at its office at the Canadian Embassy in Washington, DC.

On July 16, 2018, Conservative Premier Doug Ford withdrew Monique Smith from her position as the representative in a Washington, DC effective immediately. https://www.cbc.ca/amp/1.4748423

Cabinet positions

After politics
On August 15, 2013, she was appointed by Premier Kathleen Wynne to run Ontario's office in the Canadian embassy in Washington.

Electoral record

References

External links
 

1965 births
21st-century Canadian politicians
21st-century Canadian women politicians
Living people
Women government ministers of Canada
Members of the Executive Council of Ontario
Ontario Liberal Party MPPs
People from North Bay, Ontario
Queen's University at Kingston alumni
University of Toronto alumni
Women MPPs in Ontario